Baldwinowice may refer to the following places in Poland:
Baldwinowice, Lower Silesian Voivodeship (south-west Poland)
Baldwinowice, Opole Voivodeship (south-west Poland)